Scott Patterson (born 1958), American actor and minor league baseball player

Scott Patterson may also refer to:

 Scott Patterson (author), American finance journalist & author
 Scott Patterson (baseball) (born 1979), Major League Baseball relief pitcher
 Scott Patterson (curler) (1969–2004), professional Canadian curler
 Scott Patterson (director) (born 1962), Australian film director and editor
 Scott Patterson (Paralympian) (born 1961), Canadian track athlete, alpine skier and swimmer
 Scott Patterson (skier, born 1992), American cross-country skier

See also 
 Scott Paterson (born 1972), Scottish footballer
 G. Scott Paterson (born 1964), venture capitalist